The Calumet Snobird Explorer is an American autogyro produced by Calumet Motorsports of Lansing, Illinois, introduced in May 1997. Now out of production, when it was available the aircraft was supplied as a kit for amateur construction.

Design and development
Calumet Aeronautics acquired the Snobird Explorer design when it purchased the assets of the SnoBird Aircraft Company. Putting the Snobird design back into production, the company name was changed to Calumet Motorsports. The gyro design was later sold to another owner and then back to Calumet Motorsports, although the design remains out of production.

It features a single main rotor, a single-seat open cockpit, tricycle landing gear and a twin-cylinder, air-cooled, two-stroke, single-ignition  Rotax 447 engine in pusher configuration. Alternate engines used include the twin-cylinder, air-cooled, two-stroke, dual-ignition  Rotax 503 and the twin-cylinder, air-cooled, two-stroke, single-ignition  2si 460-F40 engines.

The aircraft fuselage is made from a combination of composite material and aluminum and features a tall tail design to reduce engine-induced pitch. The kit was supplied with jig pre-drilled holes and was powder coated.

Operational history
By 1998 the company reported that one aircraft had been completed and was flying, with customer deliveries to commence later in 1998.

In April 2015 six examples of Snobird autogyros of all manufacture were registered in the United States with the Federal Aviation Administration, although a total of 14 had been registered at one time.

Specifications (Snobird Explorer)

See also
List of rotorcraft

References

Snobird Explorer
1990s United States sport aircraft
1990s United States ultralight aircraft
1990s United States civil utility aircraft
Homebuilt aircraft
Single-engined pusher autogyros
Aircraft first flown in 1997